United Nations Security Council Resolution 2053 was unanimously adopted on 27 June 2012.

See also 
List of United Nations Security Council Resolutions 2001 to 2100

References

External links
Text of the Resolution at undocs.org

2012 United Nations Security Council resolutions
United Nations Security Council resolutions concerning the Democratic Republic of the Congo
2012 in the Democratic Republic of the Congo
June 2012 events